The Guasú Front (Guasú being the Guarani word for "big", "large" or "great") is a democratic socialist electoral alliance in Paraguay for the general election in 2013. It was formed in 2010 by a merger of the centre-left Patriotic Alliance for Change and the left-wing . It consists of eleven parties, including the Party for a Country of Solidarity, the Tekojoja People's Party. It is led by impeached former president Fernando Lugo, who also ran as a senatorial candidate. Its presidential candidate was Aníbal Carrillo.

Electoral history

Presidential elections

Chamber of Deputies elections

Senate elections

References

External links
Guasú Front's website

2010 establishments in Paraguay
Foro de São Paulo
Political parties established in 2010
Political party alliances in Paraguay
Progressive Alliance
Socialism in Paraguay
Socialist International
Paraguay